Ikuhiro Kiyota (清田 育宏, born February 11, 1986) is a Japanese professional baseball outfielder who is currently a free agent. He has played in Nippon Professional Baseball (NPB) for the Chiba Lotte Marines.

Professional career
Kiyota began his professional career in 2010 with the Chiba Lotte Marines. He made his NPB debut on May 24, 2010 and won the Japan Series with the club that year. In 2011, Kiyota batted .244/.293/.370 with 3 home runs and 25 RBI. The next year, he had improved production, batting .281/.363/.391 with 3 home runs and 29 RBI. He regressed a bit in 2013, batting .255/.359/.375 with 3 home runs and 18 RBI. He struggled in 2014, batting just .170/.316/.511 in 24 games. In 2015, Kiyota had a breakout season, slashing .317/.387/.503 with career-highs in home runs (15) and RBI (67). He was named a Pacfiic League All-Star, won a Gold Glove Award, and won a Pacific League Best Nine Award.

Kiyota batted .225 with 6 home runs and 38 RBI on the year in 2016, but his production wavered the next year, as he hit only .203/.287/.286 with 3 home runs and 21 RBI. In 2018, Kiyota batted .226/.306/.295 with 2 home runs and 27 RBI. He improved the next year, posting a .253/.325/.378 batting line with 10 home runs and 57 RBI. In 2020, he continued to produce, hitting .278/.363/.467 with 7 home runs and 23 RBI in 70 games. On May 23, 2021, Kiyota was released by the Marines after he violated COVID-19 protocols in 2020 and had illicit relations with a woman after that.

References

External links

1986 births
Living people
People from Kamagaya
Baseball people from Chiba Prefecture
Toyo University alumni
Japanese baseball players
Nippon Professional Baseball outfielders
Chiba Lotte Marines players